Lietaer is a surname. Notable people with the surname include:

Bernard Lietaer (1942–2019), Belgian civil engineer, economist, writer, and academic
Eliot Lietaer (born 1990), Belgian cyclist
Noël Liétaer (1908–1941), French footballer